Callisto albicinctella is a moth of the family Gracillariidae. It is known from the Russian Far East.

The larvae feed on Prunus cerasifera. They probably mine the leaves of their host plant.

References

Gracillariinae
Moths described in 1979